The 1986 Vuelta a España was the 41st edition of the Vuelta a España, one of cycling's Grand Tours. The Vuelta began in Palma de Mallorca, with a prologue individual time trial on 22 April, and Stage 11 occurred on 3 May with a stage from Valladolid. The race finished in Jerez de la Frontera on 13 May.

Stage 11
3 May 1986 — Valladolid to Valladolid,  (ITT)

Stage 12
4 May 1986 — Valladolid to Segovia,

Stage 13
5 May 1986 — Segovia to Villalba,

Stage 14
6 May 1986 —  (Torrelodones) to Leganés,

Stage 15
7 May 1986 — Aranjuez to Albacete,

Stage 16
8 May 1986 — Albacete to Jaén,

Stage 17
9 May 1986 — Jaén to Sierra Nevada,

Stage 18
10 May 1986 — Granada to Benalmádena,

Stage 19
11 May 1986 — Benalmádena to Puerto Real,

Stage 20
12 May 1986 — Puerto Real to Jerez de la Frontera,

Stage 21
13 May 1986 — Jerez de la Frontera to Jerez de la Frontera,  (ITT)

References

1986 Vuelta a España
Vuelta a España stages